or  is a lake in Norway that lies on the borders of the municipalities of Røyrvik (in Trøndelag county) and Grane and Hattfjelldal (in Nordland county).  The  lake lies inside Børgefjell National Park and it drains to the south into the lake Namsvatnet.

See also
 List of lakes in Norway

References

Lakes of Nordland
Lakes of Trøndelag
Røyrvik
Grane, Nordland
Hattfjelldal